Collins Agyarko Nti (born 25 August 1958) is a Ghanaian politician and a member of the first Parliament of the fourth Republic representing the Asante Akyem North constituency in the Ashanti region.

Early life and education
Collins Agyarko Nti was born on 25 August 1958 at Asante Akyem North in the Ashanti region of Ghana. He attended Kumasi Polytechnic (now Kumasi Technical University) and obtained his Bachelor of Science after he studied chemistry.

Politics
Collins Agyarko Nti was first elected into parliament on the ticket of the National Democratic Congress during the 1992 Ghanaian general elections for the Asante Akim North constituency in the Ashanti region of Ghana. He contested again in 1996 and lost to Kwadwo Baah-Wiredu who polled 63% of the valid votes cast whilst Collins Agyarko polled 27%. He served for one term as a member of parliament for the Asante Akim North Constituency.

Career
Collins Agyarko Nti is the Coordinating Director of the Country Coordinating Mechanism(CCM). He is a Government official, and was also a former member of parliament for the Asante Akim North Constituency in the Ashanti Region of Ghana.

Religion
Nti is a Christian.

References

Living people
1958 births
National Democratic Congress (Ghana) politicians
Ghanaian Christians
People from Ashanti Region
Ghanaian MPs 1993–1997
Ghanaian civil servants